Below is a list of newspapers published in Monaco or with news of Monaco.

 The Riviera Times, monthly, English, published in Nice, France, 
 NEWS.MC, Monaco Daily News, online only
 Riviera-Côte d'Azur Zeitung, monthly, German, published in Nice, sister publication to The Riviera Times
 Monaco Life, 10 times yearly, English, published in Wellington, Somerset, England
 L'Observateur de Monaco, monthly news magazine
 Monaco Hebdo, weekly newspaper
 Monaco-Matin, daily newspaper
 Monaco Times, Monaco Daily News

See also
List of newspapers

Monaco
Newspapers